Velella was one of a pair of submarines ordered by the Portuguese government, but taken over and completed for the  (Royal Italian Navy) during the 1930s.

Design and description
The Argo-class submarines displaced  surfaced and  submerged. Their crew numbered 46 officers and enlisted men.

For surface running, the boats were powered by two  diesel engines, each driving one propeller shaft. When submerged each propeller was driven by a  electric motor. They could reach  on the surface and  underwater.

The boats were armed with six internal  torpedo tubes, four in the bow and two in the stern for which they carried a total of 10 torpedoes. They were also armed with a single  deck gun, forward of the conning tower, for combat on the surface. The light anti-aircraft armament consisted of four single  machine guns.

Service
Velella was built by Cantieri Riuniti dell'Adriatico in its Monfalcone shipyard. The submarine had initially been ordered in 1931, but was acquired by the Italians when Portugal cancelled the order. She was launched in 1936, and saw action in the Second World War.

Notes

References

External links
 Velella Marina Militare website

Archimede-class submarines
World War II submarines of Italy
1936 ships